Dumisani Fannie Mthenjane is a South African politician. A member of the Economic Freedom Fighters, he was elected to the National Assembly in May 2019. Mthenjane currently serves as an alternate member of the Portfolio Committee on Small Business Development.

References

External links
National Assembly biography

Living people
Year of birth missing (living people)
Place of birth missing (living people)
Economic Freedom Fighters politicians
Members of the National Assembly of South Africa
21st-century South African politicians